Alessio Gonin is an Italian curler.

At the national level, he is a three-time Italian mixed doubles champion curler (2011, 2013, 2014) and two-time Italian mixed champion curler (2014, 2017).

Out of curling, he is a professional photographer.

Teams and events

Men's

Mixed

Mixed doubles

References

External links

 
 
 
 
 
 
 Alessio Stock Photos - Twenty20

Living people
Italian male curlers
Italian curling champions
Italian photographers
Year of birth missing (living people)
Place of birth missing (living people)